The local assembly of bishops is the Episcopal Conference of Chad (French: Episcopal Conference du Tchad, CET).
The ECC is a member of the Association of Episcopal Conferences of the Central African Region and Symposium of Episcopal Conferences of Africa and Madagascar (SECAM).

List of presidents of the Bishops' Conference:

1970-1981: Paul-Pierre-Yves Dalmais, Archbishop of N'Djamena

1981-1983: Henri Véniat, Bishop of Sarh

1983-2002: Charles Louis Joseph Vandame, Archbishop of N'Djamena

Since 2002: Jean-Claude Bouchard, Bishop of Palambari

See also
Catholic Church in Chad
Episcopal conference

References

External links
 http://www.gcatholic.org/dioceses/country/TD.htm
 http://www.catholic-hierarchy.org/country/td.html 

Chad
Catholic Church in Chad

it:Chiesa cattolica in Ciad#Conferenza episcopale